The National Women's Studies Association (NWSA) is an organization founded in 1977, made up of scholars and practitioners in the field of women's studies also known as women's and gender studies, feminist studies, and related names in the 21st century.

Their mission is to further the development of women's studies throughout the world through open dialogue and communication. Since its inception, NWSA has been the subject of controversy based on its failure to include marginalized women in the conversation. The NWSA offer two types of memberships, individual and institutional, both of which offer a variety of different benefits. In addition to hosting annual conferences, NWSA also provides access to constituency groups, and offers various awards, including NWSA Book Prizes, Women's Center Committee Awards, and Student Awards and Prizes.

Founding 
In 1973, women's studies pioneer Catharine R. Stimpson called for the founding of a national women's studies organization. Discussions took place over the next three years in women’s studies spaces. In 1976, Sybil Weir from San Jose State University called an official meeting for people interested in creating plans for a national organization.

Following a grant from the Ford Foundation, the first NWSA conference was held in January 1977 at the University of San Francisco, co-sponsored by San Jose State University and the Santa Clara County Commission on the Status of Women. Over 500 people attended the three-day convention. According to Barbara W. Gerber, who served on NWSA's Coordinating Council, NSA aimed to be inclusive of all women, with a subset of regional groups, and agreed upon a leadership group known as the Coordinating Council.

Mission 
NWSA was formed to further the social, political, and professional development of women's studies throughout the world. The organization centers open dialogue and communication among women for positive social change and was founded upon the women's liberation movement. It promotes freedom from sexism, racism, homophobia, antisemitism, anti-Zionism, and from all suppressive ideologies and institutions. Its goals are to equip women to enter society and transform the world to one without systemic oppression.

Annual Pre-Conferences 

 Program Administration and Development (PAD) Pre-Conference
 Women's Centers Committee (WCC) Pre-Conference
 Feminist Teacher Workshop

Women of Color Leadership Project 
The WoCC encourages employment and student participation by women of color in women's studies, by offering positions of leadership at the organization.

Controversies

Racism and classism 
Women of color protested racism within the organization during its early years, as did immigrant women. Men also reported being treated as if they had no right to participate. In 1979, after attending the conference, Nupur Chaudhuri wrote an article A Third World Woman's View of the Convention, outlining her negative experiences. As a result, the NWSA created the Third World Caucus, later the Women of Color Caucus, and established a coordinating council of the group. Chaudhuri drafted guidelines for inclusiveness to eliminate sexism and racism in future conferences, which were implemented in 1980.  During NWSA's 1981 conference in Storrs, Connecticut, poet Audre Lorde gave the keynote address admonishing conference-goers that if "women in the academy truly want a dialogue about racism, it will require recognizing the needs and living contexts of other women."

The 1981 conference was further criticized by Chela Sandoval for its classism, as travel fare and conference fees were difficult to afford. This coupled with the theme of racism caused attendance rates to suffer. The lack of inclusivity for women of color led to the Third World Women's Consciousness Raising group to discuss issues of racism and classism in NWSA.

During the closing of the 1981 conference Barbara Smith, a member of the Combahee River Collective (CRC), asserted that for all the white women within NWSA tired of hearing about racism, there were just as many women of color who were sick of experiencing it. She criticizes NWSA for the disconnect between their goals and actions by stating their definition of feminism fails at being inclusive of all women. Smith's work within the CRC argues not to separate race from class or sexual oppression because they are experienced simultaneously.

Former NWSA president Beverly Guy-Sheftall noted, "I wanted NWSA to be an inclusive, multiracial, multicultural organization where women of color and their feminisms would not be marginalized." Led by feminists like Guy-Sheftall, NWSA has worked to center intersectionality in its institutional practices and leadership structure with the support of a Ford Foundation grant.

Lesbian separatism 
During the 1977 conference, lesbians spoke about their invisibility in NWSA. Lesbians during this time were combating internal and external homophobia along with their racist and classist issues. This birthed the Lesbian Women's Caucus which sought to address issues of homophobia from within the organization and the media.

Anti-Zionism 
In 2015, the NWSA membership voted to "back the boycott, divestment, and sanctions movement against Israel" along with other major academic organizations. In response to critiques of antisemitism following their support of member Jasbir K. Puar, NWSA responded by stating the organization holds firm in their conviction.

Membership 
NWSA offers individual annual memberships with cost bands based on employment, income, and student status. Individuals members can find colleagues in the member directory, present at the annual conference, receive reduced registration rates, apply for scholarships and conference grants, apply for NWSA awards and prizes, and participate in the discussion forums. Benefits of being an individual membership include being able to be a representation member and have the ability to discuss ideas. 

Institutions can list their program, department, or nonprofit organization in the public member directory, receive three complimentary student memberships annually, post employment listings related to women's studies, and participate in the discussion forum.

The National Women’s Studies Association held its annual conference. The conference that was held in November year of 2013. The conference was called “ Negotiating Points of Encounter”. The conference focused on sub themes such as “the sacred and profane”, “border and margins”, “futures of the feminist past”, and “body politics”.

Constituency groups
NWSA membership offers the ability to join several constituency groups, including:

Caucuses

 Aging and Ageism Caucus
 Community College Caucus
 Feminist Mothering Caucus
 Girls and Girls Studies Caucus
 Graduate Student Caucus
 Indigenous Peoples Caucus
 Jewish Caucus
 Lesbian Caucus
 North American Asian Feminist Collective
 Queer and Trans People of Color Caucus
 South Asian Feminist Caucus
 Trans/Gender-Variant Caucus
 Transnational Feminisms Caucus
 Undergraduate Student Caucus
 Women of Color Caucus

Interest groups

 Animal Studies/Animal Ethics Interest Group
 Arts and Performance Interest Group	
 Asexuality Studies Interest Group	
 Confronting Campus Sexual Assault	
 Contingent Faculty Interest Group	
 Disabilities Studies Interest Group	
 Distance Education Interest Group
 Early Modern Women Interest Group	
 Fat Studies Interest Group	
 Feminism and Activism Interest Group	
 Feminist Masculinities Interest Group	
 Feminist Media Studies Interest Group	
 Feminist Pedagogy Interest Group	
 Feminist Spirituality Interest Group	
 Feminists for Justice In/For Palestine	
 Gender, Women's, and Feminist Studies (GWFS) PhD Interest Group
 Law and Public Policy Interest Group	
 Publishing Feminisms Interest Group	
 Reproductive Justice Interest Group	
 Third Wave Feminisms Interest Group	

Task forces

 Anti White Supremacy Task Force	
 International Task Force	
 Librarians Task Force	
 Science and Technology Task Force	
 Social Justice Education Task Force

Journal 
NWSA publishes Feminist Formations, a journal that cultivates feminist conversations from around the world regarding research, theory, activism, teaching, and learning. The journal changed its name from NWSA Journal in 2010 to be inclusive of both NWSA conference papers and works from academic sources and individuals globally.

Awards 
Every year during the months of April–June, NWSA presents awards and prizes for books, students, and women's centers:

Book prizes

 Gloria E. Anzaldúa Book Prize
 Alison Piepmeier Book Prize
 Sara A. Whaley Book Prize  
 NWSA/UIP First Book Prize

Student prizes

 NWSA Graduate Scholarship
 NWSA Women of Color Caucus-Frontiers Student Essay Award
 Trans/Gender-Variant Caucus Award
 Lesbian Caucus Award

Women's center awards

 Outstanding Achievement Award
 Emerging Leader Award
 Founders Awards
 Lifetime Achievement Award

Presidents
Prior to 1983, the board of directors was styled as a coordinating council without a hierarchical structure. There was no defined leadership and the size of the council made conducting business difficult. Council members included faculty, staff, and students elected from twelve regional divisions as well as special focus areas like, representatives of the Global South, lesbians, staff, and pre-K-12 teachers. Members who served from 1977 to 1983 included:

Coordinating Council (1977–1983)

Chairs (1983–1993) and presidents (1994–present) 
1983–1985, Clare Bright, Mankato State University 
1985–1986, Martha Maas, Ohio State University 
1986–1987, Helen A. Moore, University of Nebraska 
 1987–1988, Wilma Beaman, State University of New York at Oswego
 1988–1989, Patricia A. Gozemba, Salem State College 
 1989-1991, Marlene Longenecker, Ohio State University
 1991–1992, Wilma Boddie-Beaman, The College at Brockport, State University of New York
 1992–1993 (co-chairs), Sue Mansfield, Claremont McKenna College and Berenice A. Carroll, Purdue University
 1993–1994, Vivien Ng, State University of New York at Albany
 1994–1995, Sandra Coyner, Southern Oregon University 
 1995–1996, Marjorie Pryse, State University of New York at Albany
 1996–1997, Betty J. Harris, University of Oklahoma
 1997–1998, Barbara Gerber, State University of New York at Oswego
 1998–1999, Bonnie Zimmerman, San Diego State University
 1999–2000, Berenice Carroll, Purdue University 
 2000–2001, Annette Van Dyke, University of Illinois Springfield
 2001-2002, Magdalena García Pinto, University of Missouri
 2002-2003, María C. González, University of Houston
 2003–2004, Colette Morrow, Purdue University-Calumet
 2004–2005, Jacquelyn Zita, University of Minnesota
 2005–2006, Judith Roy, Century College
 2006–2008, Barbara J. Howe, West Virginia University
 2008–2010, Beverly Guy-Sheftall, Spelman College
 2010–2012, Bonnie Thornton Dill, University of Maryland
 2012–2014, Yi-Chun Tricia Lin, Southern Connecticut State University
 2014–2016, Vivian M. May, Syracuse University
 2016–2018, Barbara Ransby, University of Illinois Chicago
 2018–2020, Premilla Nadasen, Barnard College
 2020–2022, Karsonya Wise Whitehead Loyola University Maryland

References

External links

National Women's Studies Association (NWSA) records at the University of Maryland libraries

Professional associations based in the United States
Member organizations of the American Council of Learned Societies